Epipagis flavispila is a moth in the family Crambidae. It is found in Nigeria.

References

Moths described in 1913
Spilomelinae